William Laird Cowher (born May 8, 1957) is an American sports analyst, former football player and coach. Following a six-year playing career as a linebacker in the National Football League (NFL), he served as a head coach in the NFL for 15 seasons with the Pittsburgh Steelers. He began his coaching career as an assistant under Marty Schottenheimer for the Cleveland Browns and Kansas City Chiefs, serving as the latter's defensive coordinator from 1989 to 1991. Cowher was named head coach of the Steelers in 1992, whom he led until his retirement following the 2006 season. After retiring, he joined The NFL Today as a studio analyst.

Under Cowher, Pittsburgh won eight division titles, two AFC Championship Games, and Super Bowl XL. Cowher's Super Bowl victory marked the first championship title for the franchise in over two decades and the first not to be won by Chuck Noll, his predecessor. The Steelers appeared in the postseason 10 times with Cowher, including six consecutive appearances from his 1992 hiring to 1997, which made him the second NFL head coach to reach the playoffs during his first six seasons after Paul Brown. He was inducted to the Pro Football Hall of Fame in 2020.

Early life
Born in Pittsburgh, Pennsylvania, Cowher excelled in football, basketball, and track for Carlynton High. At NC State, he was a starting linebacker, team captain, and team MVP in his senior year. He graduated in 1979 with a bachelor's degree in education.

Professional career
Cowher began his NFL career as a linebacker with the Philadelphia Eagles in 1979, but signed with the Cleveland Browns the following year. Cowher played three seasons (1980–82) in Cleveland, making him a member of the Kardiac Kids, before being traded back to the Eagles, where he played two more years (1983–84). His tenure in Philadelphia included tackling a young Jeff Fisher (who later became the head coach of the Tennessee Titans and St. Louis Rams) when playing against the Chicago Bears, causing Fisher to break his leg. The two would later be rival head coaches and friends in the AFC Central division, and Fisher has credited his injury at the hands of Cowher with having the unintended consequence of propelling him into coaching.

Cowher primarily played special teams during his playing career; subsequently, he placed emphasis on special teams during his coaching career. Cowher credits being a "bubble player" during his playing career with influencing his coaching career, feeling that such players work the hardest for a roster spot (and sometimes still get cut, hence the term "bubble player"), and thus make better head coaches than those with successful playing careers.

Coaching career

Assistant jobs
Cowher began his coaching career in 1985 at age 28 under Marty Schottenheimer with the Cleveland Browns. Cowher, who had played under Schottenheimer in Cleveland when Schottenheimer was the team's defensive coordinator, stated that he took a coaching position despite taking a significant pay cut from what he would have made as a player with the Eagles in 1985 because he saw his fortunes as a player limited and saw more of a future as a coach.

He was the Browns' special teams coach in 1985–86 and secondary coach in 1987–88 before following Schottenheimer to the Kansas City Chiefs in 1989 as defensive coordinator. He was a finalist for the Cincinnati Bengals head coaching position in 1991 following the dismissal of Sam Wyche, but was passed over in favor of Dave Shula.

Pittsburgh Steelers
He became the 15th head coach in Steelers history when he succeeded Chuck Noll on January 21, 1992 – but only the team's second head coach since the NFL merger in 1970, beating out fellow Pittsburgh native and Pitt alumnus (and eventual Pitt head coach) Dave Wannstedt (Wannstedt instead became the coach of the Chicago Bears the following season). Under Cowher, the Steelers showed an immediate improvement from the disappointing 7–9 season the year before, going 11–5 and earning home-field advantage in the AFC after the Steelers had missed the playoffs six times out of the previous seven years. In 1995, at age 38, he became the youngest coach to lead his team to a Super Bowl. Cowher is only the second coach in NFL history to lead his team to the playoffs in each of his first six seasons as head coach, joining Pro Football Hall of Fame member Paul Brown.

In Cowher's 15 seasons, the Steelers captured eight division titles, earned 10 postseason playoff berths (including six straight in his first six seasons), played in 21 playoff games, advanced to six AFC Championship games and made two Super Bowl appearances. He is one of only six coaches in NFL history to claim at least seven division titles. At the conclusion of the 2005 season, the Steelers had the best record of any team in the NFL since Cowher was hired as head coach.

On February 5, 2006, Cowher's Pittsburgh Steelers won Super Bowl XL by defeating the Seattle Seahawks 21–10, giving Cowher his first Super Bowl ring. Including the Super Bowl, Cowher's teams over the years had compiled a record of 108–1–1 in games in which they built a lead of at least 11 points.

On January 5, 2007, Cowher resigned after 15 years of being the Steelers head coach. Cowher's record as a head coach was 161–99–1, including the playoffs.  He was succeeded by Mike Tomlin.

On January 11, 2020, Bill Cowher was told live on CBS pregame show that he was being inducted into the Pro Football Hall of Fame as part of its centennial class by its president David Baker.

After coaching
On February 15, 2007, he signed on to The NFL Today on CBS as a studio analyst, joining Dan Marino, Shannon Sharpe, and Boomer Esiason.

In 2007, Cowher appeared in the ABC reality television series Fast Cars and Superstars: The Gillette Young Guns Celebrity Race, featuring a dozen celebrities in a stock car racing competition.  Cowher matched up against Gabrielle Reece and William Shatner.

On March 4, 2008, Cowher responded to rumors concerning his coaching future by stating, "I'm not going anywhere." The rumors started after the Cowhers placed their Raleigh, North Carolina home on the market, but their intention was to build a new house two miles away.

Putting an end to numerous unfounded rumors of his return to coaching in the NFL in 2009, Cowher stated on The NFL Today that he did not plan to coach again in the immediate future.

In July 2010, Cowher was the keynote speaker for National Agents Alliance at their Leadership Conference. He talked about work ethic, leadership and how that transfers into the work force. He said it's not about what you accomplish, it's about who you touch along the way.

Cowher had a part in the movie The Dark Knight Rises (2012), which was filmed at Heinz Field, the home of the Steelers, on Pittsburgh’s North Side. He played the head coach of the Gotham Rogues.

Coaching tree

Assistant coaches under Cowher that became head coaches in the NFL or NCAA:
 Dom Capers: Carolina Panthers (1995–1998), Houston Texans (2002–2005)
 Chan Gailey: Dallas Cowboys (1998–1999), Georgia Tech (2002–2007), Buffalo Bills (2010–2012)
 Jim Haslett: New Orleans Saints (2000–2005), St. Louis Rams (2008)
 Dick LeBeau: Cincinnati Bengals (2000–2002)
 Marvin Lewis: Cincinnati Bengals (2003–2018)
 Mike Mularkey: Buffalo Bills (2004–2005), Jacksonville Jaguars (2012), Tennessee Titans (2015–2017)
 Ken Whisenhunt: Arizona Cardinals (2007–2012), Tennessee Titans (2014–2015)
 Bruce Arians: Indianapolis Colts (2012, interim), Arizona Cardinals (2013–2017), Tampa Bay Buccaneers (2019–2021)
 David Culley: Houston Texans (2021)

Players under Cowher that became head coaches in the NFL:
Mike Vrabel: Tennessee Titans (2018–present)

Personal life 

Cowher's late wife, Kaye (née Young), also a North Carolina State University graduate, played professional basketball for the New York Stars of the (now defunct) Women's Pro Basketball League with her twin sister, Faye. Kaye was featured in the book Mad Seasons: The Story of the First Women's Professional Basketball League, 1978–1981, by Karra Porter (University of Nebraska Press, 2006). Kaye Cowher died of skin cancer at age 54 on July 23, 2010. The couple had three daughters: Meagan, Lauren, and Lindsay. Meagan and Lauren played basketball at Princeton University. Lindsay played basketball at Wofford College before transferring to Elon University. In 2007, the Cowher family moved to Raleigh, North Carolina, from the Pittsburgh suburb of Fox Chapel. Meagan married former NHL forward Kevin Westgarth in 2011. Lindsay married former NBA forward Ryan Kelly of the Atlanta Hawks on August 2, 2014.

Cowher married Veronica Stigeler in 2014. In 2018 Cowher put his Raleigh house in North Ridge Country Club up for sale after announcing he would be moving to New York full-time.

In July 2020, Cowher and his wife announced they had tested positive for COVID-19.

Cowher co-authored an autobiography, Heart and Steel, in 2021.

Endorsements
Cowher was on the cover of EA Sports' 2006 video game NFL Head Coach. He appears in TV advertising for Time Warner Cable. In the video game Madden NFL 19, he voiced himself in the mini-game Longshot 2: Homecoming. In the mini-game, he makes his return to coaching as the head coach of the Houston Texans.

Head coaching record

See also
 List of National Football League head coaches with 50 wins
 List of North Carolina State University people
 List of Super Bowl head coaches

References

Further reading

External links

 Coaching stats at profootballreference.com

1957 births
Living people
People from Crafton, Pennsylvania
American football linebackers
Cleveland Browns coaches
Cleveland Browns players
Kansas City Chiefs coaches
NC State Wolfpack football players
Philadelphia Eagles players
Pittsburgh Steelers head coaches
National Football League announcers
National Football League defensive coordinators
Sportspeople from Raleigh, North Carolina
Players of American football from Pennsylvania
Super Bowl-winning head coaches
Pro Football Hall of Fame inductees
Players of American football from Raleigh, North Carolina